In statistics, the residual sum of squares (RSS),  also known as the sum of squared residuals (SSR) or the sum of squared estimate of errors (SSE),  is the sum of the squares of residuals (deviations predicted from actual empirical values of data).  It is a measure of the discrepancy between the data and an estimation model, such as a linear regression. A small RSS indicates a tight fit of the model to the data. It is used as an optimality criterion in parameter selection and model selection.

In general, total sum of squares = explained sum of squares + residual sum of squares.  For a proof of this in the multivariate ordinary least squares (OLS) case, see partitioning in the general OLS model.

One explanatory variable

In a model with a single explanatory variable, RSS is given by:

Matrix expression for the OLS residual sum of squares

The general regression model with  observations and  explanators, the first of which is a constant unit vector whose coefficient is the regression intercept, is

The residual vector ; so the residual sum of squares is:

,

(equivalent to the square of the norm of residuals). In full:

,

where  is the hat matrix, or the projection matrix in linear regression.

Relation with Pearson's product-moment correlation 
The least-squares regression line is given by

,

Therefore,

 

where 

The Pearson product-moment correlation is given by  therefore,

See also
Akaike information criterion#Comparison with least squares
Chi-squared distribution#Applications
Degrees of freedom (statistics)#Sum of squares and degrees of freedom
Errors and residuals in statistics
Lack-of-fit sum of squares
Mean squared error
Reduced chi-squared statistic, RSS per degree of freedom
Squared deviations
Sum of squares (statistics)

References

 

Least squares
Errors and residuals